Paraturbinidae is an extinct family of snails from the Mesozoic period, gastropod mollusks.

Knight, J. B. et al. Treatise on Invertebrate Paleontology, vol I. 1960. Paleozoic is an incorrect inference from Bouchet and Rocroi. 
 
This family is unassigned to superfamily. This family has no subfamilies.

References 

Prehistoric gastropods